Ailuroedus is a genus of birds in the bowerbird family, Ptilonorhynchidae, native to forests in Australia and New Guinea. The common name, catbird, refers to these species' "wailing cat-like calls".  The scientific name Ailuroedus is derived from the Greek 'ailouros', meaning cat, and 'eidos', referring to form (or perhaps from oaidos, singer).

Description 
Catbirds are characterize by ivory-colored bill with the hooked maxilla, large head, green dorsal plumage, ventral spotting, powerful grasping claws and fig-eating habit.

In contrast to the other genera within the Ptilonorhynchidae family, all of the Ailuroedus catbirds lack marked sexual dimorphism, are pair bonded, monogamous breeders, with both parents caring for the offspring. They form pair bonds in which the male helps to build the nest, and have simple arboreal chasing displays, without bowers or stages.

Taxonomy 

Traditionally, the Ailuroedus catbirds were classified as three species. However, a phylogenetic and morphological paper by Irestedt et al. (2015). revealed seven new species, leading to a total of ten distinct species. In the same study, the results confirm that the catbirds are divided into two major clades, a lowland group consisting of the New Guinean white-eared catbird, and a mid-mountain clade including the black-eared catbird and the Australian green catbird.

Species
Ochre-breasted catbird  (Ailuroedus stonii)
White-eared catbird (Ailuroedus buccoides)
Tan-capped catbird (Ailuroedus geislerorum)
Green catbird (Ailuroedus crassirostris)
Spotted catbird (Ailuroedus maculosus)
Huon catbird (Ailuroedus astigmaticus)
Black-capped catbird (Ailuroedus melanocephalus)
Northern catbird (Ailuroedus jobiensis)
Arfak catbird (Ailuroedus arfakianus)
Black-eared catbird (Ailuroedus melanotis)

References

 
Bird genera
Taxonomy articles created by Polbot